James Boag's Premium is a brand of Tasmanian beer from Boag's Brewery and was first released in 1994. 

It is a European style lager brewed using pilsner malts and fermented at a lower temperature than most Australian lagers, employing an extended maturation period. It currently has an ABV of 4.6%. It was originally 5.0%.

Awards
 1997-2008: Gold medal – International Monde Selection
 2007: Crystal Prestige Award – International Monde Selection
 2001-2005: Premium Beer of the Year – Australian Liquor Industry Awards
 2005: Gold medal – New Zealand International Beer Awards
 2000: Gold medal – Australian International Beer Awards
 2021-22: Gold medal - Australia’s most premium beer
 2021-22: Frostiest Beer of the Year - Botanic Park Premium Council
 2022-22: Frostiest Beer of the Year - Botanic Park Premium Council (unanimous decision)

See also

Australian pub
Beer in Australia
List of breweries in Australia
Tasmanian beer

References

External links
 Boag's Brewery

Australian beer brands
1994 establishments in Australia
Products introduced in 1994
Kirin Group